Michael Alldis (born 25 May 1968) is a British former professional boxer who competed from 1992 to 2002 and made a comeback in 2015. He challenged once for the IBO super bantamweight title in 1998. At regional level, he held the British super bantamweight title twice between 1999 and 2002 and the Commonwealth super bantamweight title in 2002.

References

External links

Image - Michael Alldis

1968 births
Bantamweight boxers
English male boxers
Featherweight boxers
Living people
Sportspeople from Crawley
Boxers from Greater London
Super-bantamweight boxers
Super-featherweight boxers